Pittentrail is a hamlet on the A839 road, in the Rogart parish in east Sutherland, in the Scottish Highlands. The River Fleet runs to the south. The settlement became better known in the area when Rogart railway station was built in the village. The station is still in use and operates as a request stop on the Far North Line, but the station buildings have been converted into private residential use. The station yard has been made into gardens, with old signs and other railway memorabilia lying about. The original sidings have been retained, and the train carriages sitting on them converted into a novel independent youth hostel, known as sleeperzzz.com (sic).  The lively Pittentrail Inn is on the north side of the village, near the war memorial.

Etymology
Etymologically speaking, the first element the name Pittentrail is pett, a Pictish word borrowed into Gaelic meaning "land-holding, unit of land". The second is Gaelic tràill, another loan-word, from the Old Norse for "thrall, slave".

Notes

Populated places in Sutherland